Thomas Smith II (1682-1728) of Broxtowe, Nottinghamshire and of Gaddesby in Leicestershire was a member of the Smith family of bankers, being the eldest son of Thomas Smith I (1631-1699) who in 1658 founded  Smith's Bank in Nottingham.

He served as Sheriff of Leicestershire in 1717-18 and in 1717 he was granted a coat of arms (Or, a chevron cotised sable between three demi-griffins couped of the last the two in chief respecting each other) to be borne by him and by all male descendants of his father.

He married Mary Manley, a daughter of Thomas Manley of Thorney Hills, Staffordshire, but left no male issue, only 5 daughters. The family banking business was carried on and expanded by his two younger brothers Abel Smith I (1686-1756) of East Stoke, Nottinghamshire  and Samuel Smith (1688-1751) of London.

References

1728 deaths
High Sheriffs of Leicestershire
1682 births